James Ryan (March 15, 1821 – 1892) was a political figure in New Brunswick, Canada. He represented Albert County in the Legislative Assembly of New Brunswick from 1870 to 1878 as a Liberal member.

He was born in Kings County, New Brunswick, the son of Matthew Ryan. In 1848, he married Elizabeth Trites. Ryan was a justice of the peace. His election in 1875 was appealed but he won the by-election that followed later that year.

References 
The Canadian parliamentary companion and annual register, 1877, CH Mackintosh

1821 births
1892 deaths
New Brunswick Liberal Association MLAs
Canadian justices of the peace